This is a list of F.C. Nordsjælland's managers and their records, from 1991, when the team was founded as Farum Boldklub, to the present day.

Records
There have been eight different managers of FCN since 1991. Both Jørgen Tideman (1994–1999) and Morten Wieghorst (2006–2011) are the longest-running manager in terms of time. Tom Nielsen (2000) is the shortest-running manager of FCN, having coached the club for less than a year before being replaced. The most successful manager was Wieghorst, winning F.C. Nordsjælland their first trophy in 2010 with the Danish Cup and again in 2011. In terms of league position, Kasper Hjulmand (2011–2014 and 2016–present) took FCN to its highest league finish in 2011-12 with 1st place in the Danish Superliga.

Managers
As of 23 May 2012.

Key
* Served as caretaker manager.
† Served as caretaker manager before being appointed permanently.

Footnotes and references

External links 
 FCN (Official website)

FC Nordsjælland
Nordsjaelland
F.C. Nordsjaelland